Tramp art is a style of woodworking which emerged in America in the latter half of the 19th century. Some of tramp art's defining characteristics include chip or notch carving, the reclamation of cheap or available wood such as that from cigar boxes and shipping crates, the use of simple tools such as penknives, and the layering of materials into geometric shapes through glue or nails. One technique used in tramp art is Crown of Thorns joinery.

History
Although widespread use of wooden cigar boxes in the 1850s sparked involvement in tramp art, it was most prevalent during the Great Depression.
Tramp art was made around the world but it prospered in the United States. Examples can be found in every state. The most common forms were the box and the frame and although there were no rules or patterns to lend commonality in the artists’ work there were objects made in every conceivable shape and size including full sized furniture and objects of whimsy.

Tramp art was an art form made wherever the raw materials used in its construction were found. It appealed to men who might have made an important body of work such as ‘Sunflower’ artist John Martin Zubersky (active c. 1912 – 1920) or the wonderfully expressive wall pockets by John Zadzora (active circa 1910) but also to men who might have made one piece in their lifetime. It was easy to make and appealed to anyone who had a desire to take a pocketknife to wood.

There were countless men, some women, and even children who historically constructed tramp art.

Origins of the term
A 1959 article by Frances Lichten in Pennsylvania Folklife used the term "tramp work" to describe crafts constructed from waste materials such as discarded cigar boxes and assembled with a penknife. Contemporary scholars and art dealers such as Clifford A. Wallach have noted that while this art form may have been practiced among America's itinerant population, it was by no means unique to them and was practiced by factory workers, farmers, and laborers in other occupations.

In 1975 Helaine Fendelman published the first book on tramp art, Tramp Art an Itinerant's Folk Art. The book acted as a catalog to the first museum show on the art form sponsored by the American Folk Art Museum. In 2017, the Museum of International Folk Art put on an exhibition that highlighted the enduring nature and broad reach of tramp art.

Bibliography
Books on Tramp Art:

See also
Folk art

References

External links
American Folk Art Museum

American art movements